Amezcua Contreras may refer to any of the leaders of the Colima Cartel:

 Adán Amezcua Contreras (born  1969)
 Jesús Amezcua Contreras (born  1975)
 Luis Amezcua Contreras (born  1974)